Sir Charles Leyshon Dillwyn-Venables-Llewelyn, 2nd Baronet (29 June 1870 – 24 June 1951) was a Welsh Conservative Member of Parliament (MP) who briefly represented Radnorshire in the House of Commons and served as Lord-Lieutenant of Radnorshire.

Political career 
Llewelyn was elected Conservative MP for Radnorshire in January 1910 during the hung parliament of that year, but lost the seat in the election in December.  He inherited the baronetcy on the death of his father in 1927. He was Lord-Lieutenant of Radnorshire from 1929 to 1949 and High Sheriff of Radnorshire in 1924.

Following his 1893 marriage to Katherine Minna, daughter of Richard Lister Venables, the Llysdinam estate came into the family and Sir Charles assumed the additional surname of Venables. He established a wildlife centre on the estate, today run by Cardiff University. His daughter, Agnes Barbara Dillwyn-Venables-Llewelyn, married naval officer Cedric Holland on 15 June 1925.

He died five days before his 81st birthday in June 1951, last survivor of the 22 MPs who only served in the parliament of 1910.

Personal life 
Llewelyn was born in 1870 to Sir John Dillwyn-Llewelyn, 1st Baronet and his wife who was the daughter of Sir Michael Hicks Beach, 8th Baronet. His father was High Sheriff of Glamorgan, Mayor of Swansea and MP for Swansea. Sir Charles' son, Sir Michael set up the Field Centre at Llysdinam in 1970 which was run by Cardiff University until 2010.

References 

History of the Dillwyn-Venables-Llewelyn family
Kidd, Charles, Williamson, David (editors). Debrett's Peerage and Baronetage (1990 edition). New York: St Martin's Press, 1990,

External links 

1870 births
1951 deaths
Conservative Party (UK) MPs for Welsh constituencies
Baronets in the Baronetage of the United Kingdom
Lord-Lieutenants of Radnorshire
High Sheriffs of Radnorshire
UK MPs 1910
Dillwyn family